Teodoro Sampaio may refer to:
 Teodoro Fernandes Sampaio (1855–1937), Brazilian engineer, geographer and historiographer
 Teodoro Sampaio, Bahia, a municipality in the state of Bahia, Brazil
 Teodoro Sampaio, São Paulo, a municipality in the state of São Paulo, Brazil

See also  
 Sampaio (disambiguation)